Sammee Tong (April 21, 1901 – October 27, 1964) was an American film and television character actor. One of Tong's more notable roles was that of Peter Tong on the sitcom Bachelor Father, which aired on all three national networks from 1957 to 1962.

Early life and career
Born in San Francisco, Tong lived in Palo Alto before moving with his family to Honolulu. He graduated from Stanford University.

Tong attempted to break into acting on the stage during the Depression, forming an act called the Three Celestials that played in neighborhood theaters and was booked into the Los Angeles Orpheum. He found he could not secure acting roles because of his ethnicity. He worked in Chinese nightclubs in New York City, Los Angeles, and San Francisco, where he sang and performed comedy routines. During his nightclub years, he changed the spelling of his name to "Sammee" because he said it "looked better in print."

Career 
Tong signed with Columbia Pictures, and in 1934, he made his film debut in a bit part in the comedy film The Captain Hates the Sea. In 1939 he returned to his home town as director of entertainment at the Chinese Village of San Francisco's World's Fair, and began the first Chinese radio hour on KSAN. Throughout the 1940s, he had small, usually uncredited, roles in films. He returned to Hollywood in the early 1950s and took roles on television.

Tong made his television debut in 1953 in an episode of You Are There. The following year, he appeared in a recurring role as "George, the cook" in a series of television shorts which aired during The Mickey Mouse Club entitled The Adventures of Spin and Marty. In 1955, he reprised his role as George in the feature-length film Spin and Marty: The Movie. He also had a role in the sequel series The Further Adventures of Spin and Marty.

In 1957, he landed a co-starring role in the sitcom Bachelor Father, starring John Forsythe and Noreen Corcoran. In the series, Tong portrayed "Peter Tong,” Bentley Gregg's (Forsythe) live-in houseboy and valet. Although he was playing a servant, Tong enjoyed the role stating, "Houseboys in movies and the theater always bow low, mutter a few sing song words and disappear, but not on this show. I get dialogue and laughs." In his Bachelor Father role, Tong was not subservient and at one point walked out because he was not paid enough. He spoke with an accent even though the actor was born in the United States.

After Bachelor Father'''s cancellation in 1962, Tong was cast as Sammy Ling in the ABC sitcom Mickey, starring Mickey Rooney. Due to low ratings, ABC was considering canceling Mickey. The network was hesitant to cancel the series due to the popularity of Tong's character who had a solid fanbase thanks to Tong's role in Bachelor Father. Tong's death effectively ended any chance for the series' survival and ABC canceled Mickey in December 1964.

Tong's final screen appearance was as "Cook" in the 1965 film Fluffy, starring Tony Randall and Shirley Jones. The film was released after Tong's death.

Death
Tong, who lived alone and never married or had children, was found dead in his Palms, Los Angeles apartment by his close friend, Ben Wong, on October 27,
1964. Tong had died from an intentional barbiturate overdose. Police found an empty bottle of sleeping pills by his body and several notes addressed to his landlady, his attorney and police. In the note addressed to police, he gave no reason why he committed suicide only stating, "I have taken my own life. No one is to blame." Tong is buried in Forest Lawn Memorial Park in Glendale, California.

In his 1991 autobiography, Life is Too Short, Tong's co-star Mickey Rooney claimed that Tong was a heavy gambler and committed suicide over money issues. According to Rooney,
Tong became despondent and upset after learning that Mickey'' faced cancellation because he owed money to the mafia.

Filmography

References

External links

 

1901 births
1964 suicides
20th-century American male actors
Male actors from the San Francisco Bay Area
American male comedians
20th-century American comedians
American people of Chinese descent
American male film actors
American male television actors
Burials at Forest Lawn Memorial Park (Glendale)
Drug-related suicides in California
Barbiturates-related deaths
20th-century American singers
20th-century American male singers